Guillermo Christhofer Martín Torres (born March 7, 1991, in Guadalajara, Jalisco), known as Guillermo Martín, is a Mexican professional footballer who plays for Tlaxcala F.C.

External links
 

1991 births
Living people
Footballers from Guadalajara, Jalisco
Mexican footballers
Liga MX players
Association footballers not categorized by position
21st-century Mexican people